Scutari may refer to:

 Shkodër, in Albania; also known as Scutari in Italian and traditional English usage
 Sanjak of Scutari, Ottoman province centred on the city
 Pashalik of Scutari, a semi-independent Albanian state during Ottoman rule
 Lake Skadar, on the border of Albania and Montenegro, also known as Lake Scutari
 Üsküdar (formerly Scutari), a municipality of Istanbul, Turkey on the Anatolian side of the city
 Scutari Barracks, a former hospital in Üsküdar where Florence Nightingale worked
 Shtit, a village in Svilengrad municipality, Haskovo Province, Bulgaria, known among its former Greek inhabitants as Scutari
 Scutari, a village in Mileanca Commune, Botoşani County, Romania
 Nicholas Scutari, American politician
 Scutari, a classification of Roman gladiators that used scutum shields

See also
 Skoutari (disambiguation), various places in Greece